Liquid Fly-back Booster (LFBB) was a German Aerospace Center's (DLR's) project concept to develop a liquid rocket booster capable of reusing for Ariane 5 in order to significantly reduce the high cost of space transportation and increase environmental friendliness. LFBB would replace the existing solid rocket boosters, providing main thrust during the liftoff. Once separated, two winged boosters would perform an atmospheric entry, fly back autonomously to the French Guiana, and land horizontally on the airport like an aeroplane.

Additionally a family of derivative launch vehicles was proposed in order to take an advantage of economies of scale, further reducing launch costs. These derivatives include:
 A reusable booster in a class of small and medium-lift launch vehicles like Vega and Arianespace Soyuz.
 A two-stage-to-orbit system operating a dedicated reusable orbiter.

German Aerospace Center studied Liquid Fly-back Boosters as a part of future launcher research programme from 1999 to 2004. After the cancellation of the project, publications at DLR continued until 2009.

Development 
The German Aerospace Center (DLR) studied potential future launch vehicles of the European Union under the Ausgewählte Systeme und Technologien für Raumtransport (ASTRA; English: Systems and Technologies for Space Transportation Applications) programme from 1999 to 2005, with additional studies continuing until 2009. The LFBB design was one of two projects within the ASTRA program, the other being Phoenix RLV. During development, scale models were constructed for testing various configurations in DLR's supersonic Trisonische Messstrecke Köln (TMK; English: Trisonic measuring section at Cologne) and in their Hyperschallwindkanal 2 Köln (H2K; English: Hypersonic wind canal at Cologne) wind tunnels. The preliminary mechanical design of other major elements was done by the companies EADS Space Transportation and MAN.

The advantages of reusable boosters include simplicity from using only one type of fuel, environmental friendliness, and lower reoccurring costs. Studies concluded that reusable fly-back boosters would be the most affordable and the least risky way for European space launch systems to start becoming reusable. These fly-back boosters had the potential to reduce launch costs. However, when other projects, such as Space Shuttle or VentureStar, undertook this objective, they failed to meet their goals. Supporting technologies needed for LFBB construction can be developed within 10 years, and additional launchers can be developed based on fly-back boosters to minimise costs and provide maintenance synergy across multiple classes of launch vehicles. 

Eventually, the hardware grew too large and the LFBB project was scrapped, with one member of the French space agency (CNES) remarking:

Description 

The overall concept of the liquid boosters in the LFBB programme was to retain the Ariane 5's core and upper stages, along with the payload fairings, and replace its solid rocket boosters (EAP P241, from French Étages d’Accélération à Poudre) with reusable liquid rocket boosters. These boosters would provide the main thrust during take-off. After separation, they would return to a spaceport in French Guiana for landing. This vertical take-off, horizontal landing (VTHL) mode of operation would allow liquid fly-back boosters to continue operating from the Guiana Space Centre, thus avoiding any major changes to the ascend profile of Ariane 5.

In the reference design, each LFBB consists of three engines installed in a circular arrangement at the aft of the vehicle. Each engine is a Vulcain engine with reduced expansion ratio. An additional three turbofan air-breathing engines, installed in the nose section, provide power for fly-back. The aerofoil was based on a transonic profile from the Royal Aircraft Establishment (RAE 2822).

Second, Eurojet EJ200 fly-back turbofan engines would be propelled with hydrogen to reduce fuel mass. Further, ten  thrusters placed on each side of the vehicle would be used by the reaction control system. Finally, the fourth propulsion system would be based on solid rocket motors that separate the boosters from the core stage. An up-scaled version of the motors used in existing EAP boosters would be mounted in the attachment ring and inside the wing's main structure.

After low-energy atmospheric entry, the boosters reach denser layers of the atmosphere where they perform a banking turn toward the target airfield. Gliding continues until they achieve an altitude that is optimal for engaging turbofan engines and entering cruise flight. An undercarriage is deployed and each booster lands autonomously. After separation, the boosters are not under threat of collision until they land due to small differences in their initial flight trajectories.

Derivatives
The development of liquid fly-back boosters has the potential to enable three additional space transportation systems with an objective of increasing production and creating economies of scale. The aim of the LFBB project at DLR was to reduce Ariane 5 operational costs and to develop future derivatives, including a reusable first stage of a small-to-medium launch vehicle, a super-heavy launch vehicle capable of lifting  to Low Earth orbit, and a reusable two-stage-to-orbit launch vehicle. Initially, LFBBs would be used only on Ariane 5. Over time, alternative configurations could phase out Arianespace Soyuz and Vega.

Reusable first stage

The LFBB was studied with the three upper stage composites, to attain a Reusable First Stage (RFS) configuration. The first was a Vega derivative, with a Zefiro 23 second stage, a Zefiro 9 third stage and an AVUM upper stage. The second was an Ariane 4 derivative called H-25.

Two of the lighter configurations (the Zefiro 23 and the H-25) use upper stages mounted on top of the booster. Due to the lower weight, it might have been necessary to lower the amount of fuel in a booster to ensure that the separation velocity, the flight path, and the reentry do not exceed design bounds. In the case of H-25, it might be necessary to accelerate the fly-back boosters to above  to help the upper stage achieve its desired orbit. Consequently, two solutions were proposed to decelerate the boosters after separation. However, launch performance would drop below that of the Vega derivative. Another option is to use aerodynamic forces to decelerate. However, a hypersonic parachute was deemed too expensive and too complex. As a result, an alternative ballute was proposed. Flight dynamics simulation revealed that a ballute with a cross-section of  offered the best compromise between loads on the booster and deceleration by aerodynamic forces. In this configuration, a launch performance of up to  could be achieved, partly thanks to a higher separation velocity.

The heaviest configuration uses a single booster with an asymmetrically mounted, large, expendable cryogenic stage designated H-185. It was proposed as a future variant of the Ariane 5 core stage (H158), eventually meant to phase out the main stage in a standard launch configuration with LFBB. H-185 would use a new Vulcain 3 main engine, with increased vacuum thrust. When launched with a single booster, both stages would be operated in parallel, and be delivered to a  orbit before separation. The remaining upper stage composite would weigh , with a  payload performance to SSO.

Super-Heavy Lift Launcher (SHLL)

The Super-Heavy Lift Launcher (SHLL) would consist of a new cryogenic main stage, five liquid fly-back boosters, and a re-ignitable injection stage. This configuration was designed to provide increased capabilities for complex missions, including manned explorations to the Moon and to Mars, as well as the launch of large solar-powered satellites.

The increased circumference of the main stage allows five LFBBs to be integrated with either retractable or variable-geometry wings. The Vinci engine was proofed to be sufficiently powerful for orbital insertion. Payload would be enclosed in an  fairing. The payload to LEO would be .

To avoid simultaneous separation of all boosters, either a cross-feed to the main stage, or throttling could be used. The return flight of the boosters would require an estimated  of fuel, including a 30% reserve.

Two-stage-to-orbit

The reusable two-stage-to-orbit (TSTO) launch vehicle variant of LFBB was planned to be implemented about 15 years after the addition of LFBBs to Ariane 5. However, only a preliminary analysis of TSTO was completed. The proposed configuration consisted of two boosters with retractable wings attached to the external fuel tank, and a reusable orbiter with fixed wings carrying payload on top of it. During geostationary transfer orbit (GTO) missions, an additional, expandable upper stage would be used.

The payload fairing mount atop the orbiter would be .

See also

External links
 ASTR LFBB with technical details

References

European Space Agency
Ariane (rocket family)
Space launch vehicles of Germany
Former proposed space launch system concepts
Cancelled space launch vehicles